Weder is a German language surname. It stems from the male given name Withar – and may refer to:
Christoph Weder (1966), Swiss chemist
Donald Weder (1947), American inventor and businessman
Gustav Weder (1961), Swiss bobsledder

References

German-language surnames
Surnames from given names
Swiss-German surnames